Vanessa Fernández Marte (born 3 February 1993) is a Dominican footballer who plays as a left winger for Spanish club Las Rozas CF and the Dominican Republic national team.

International career
Fernández has appeared for the Dominican Republic at the 2020 CONCACAF Women's Olympic Qualifying Championship qualification.

References 

1993 births
Living people
Dominican Republic women's footballers
Women's association football wingers
Women's association football midfielders
Dominican Republic women's international footballers
Dominican Republic expatriate women's footballers
Dominican Republic expatriate sportspeople in Spain
Expatriate women's footballers in Spain